Frances Jenkins Olcott (1872 – 29 March 1963) was the first head librarian of the children's department of the Carnegie Library of Pittsburgh in 1898.  She also wrote many children's books and books for those in the profession of providing library service to children and youth.

Early life

Olcott was born in 1872 in Paris, France near the Garden of the Batignolles.  She later lived in Albany, New York at both her parents' and grandmother's houses; this was followed by years in the country suburbs of Albany where she was tutored by her parents who provided her with a formative education.

Her father, Franklin Olcott, born in America, but educated in Göttingen and Würzburg in Germany, worked in the American Consular Service. He tutored her in German and the classics. Her mother, Julia Olcott, translated children's stories from French. According to Olcott, her father's strong vocabulary, love for poetry, and researcher's mind and her mother's fine critical powers, delicate feelings for words, and eager mind, helped to develop her intellectual skills and analytical abilities and had a strong influence on her writing. Olcott mentions the importance that her religious influences as a child had upon her writing as well. Her grandmother's formal and dignified religious influence was present alongside her parents’ Bible readings and daily prayers.

She earned her high school certificate through Regents Examinations before taking entrance examinations for the New York State Library School where she graduated in 1896.

Career

Librarian
Olcott was an assistant librarian of the Brooklyn Public Library from 1897 to 1898.  She then became the first librarian to develop and head the Children's Department at Carnegie Library of Pittsburgh and to organize a formal training program known as The Training School for Children's Librarians in 1900. Her children's department was a laboratory where she and her staff tested methods, evolved standards, and worked out problems regarding reading engagement, content selection, and material organization.  Her team's results were published and shared with other libraries and schools; her educationally minded staff with two expert bibliographers helped eventually create what became her Carnegie-supported Training School for Children's Librarians. This program became a part of the Carnegie Institute of Technology and was eventually moved to the University of Pittsburgh as the Graduate School of Library and Information Sciences.

Olcott started outreach programs to bring books into homes, schools, detention centers, and beyond.  Her efforts helped a large immigrant population at the time learn how to adapt to a new country.  She promoted the idea of having home libraries for children, and she and her colleagues would set up a reading hour where groups of children would meet in a home in the community to be read to by the librarians.

Writer
In 1911 Olcott left both Pittsburgh and her position of librarian and moved back to New York to write books for children, and books on how to be an effective children's librarian.  She wrote and edited more than 24 volumes, which sold in her lifetime for more than a half million dollars.

She was asked to write the section "Library Works with Children" for the American Library Association 1914 Manual of Library Economy.

Death
Olcott passed away on 29 March 1963 in a nursing home on Amsterdam Avenue, New York City.

Works

 1898 "Fairy Tales for Children", bibliography
 1905 "Rational Library Work and the Preparation for It"
 1909 "Story Telling: A Public Library Method"
 1910 "The Public Library: A Social Force in Pittsburgh"
 1912 The Children's Reading
 1913 The Arabian Nights' Entertainments, translated by Edward William Lane; selected, ed., and arranged by Olcott; illustrated by Monro S. Orr
 1913 Story-telling Poems
 1914 Good Stories for Great Holidays 
 1914 "Library Work with Children", American Library Association
 1915 More Tales from the Arabian Nights, transl. Lane, ed. Olcott, illus. Willy Pogány
 1915 The Jolly Book for Boys and Girls, eds. Olcott and Amena Pendleton, illus. Amy M. Sacker
 1917 Tales of the Persian Genii, illus. Willy Pogány
 1917 The Red Indian Fairy Book, illus. Frederick Richardson 
 1918 The Book of Elves and Fairies, illus. Milo Winter
 1919 The Wonder Garden: Nature Myths and Tales from All the World Over, illus. Milo Winter
 1920 Story-telling Ballads, Selected and Arranged, illus. Milo Winter 
 1922 Grimm's Fairy Tales, illus. Rie Cramer
 1922 Good Stories for Great Birthdays
 1922 Stories about George Washington: with a selection of famous poems
 1925 Wonder Tales from China Seas, illus. Dugald Stewart Walker
 1926 Wonder Tales from Windmill Lands, illus. Herman Rosse
 1927 Wonder Tales from Pirate Isles, illus. Herman Rosse
 1928 Wonder Tales from Baltic Wizards, illus. Victor G. Candell
 1929 Wonder Tales from Fairy Isles, illus. Constance Whittemore
 1930 Wonder Tales from Goblin Hills, illus. Harold Sichel,

Notes

References

External links

 
 

1872 births
1963 deaths
American expatriates in France
20th-century American writers
20th-century American women writers
American children's writers
New York State Library School alumni